Natalia Evgenyevna Ovchinnikova, married surname: Korelina is a former competitive figure skater for the Soviet Union. She is the 1983 Winter Universiade champion, 1982 Golden Spin of Zagreb silver medalist, 1982 Nebelhorn Trophy bronze medalist, and 1983 Karl Schäfer Memorial bronze medalist. She was coached by Igor Ksenofontov and Marina Obodyannikova.

Competitive highlights

References 

Soviet female single skaters
Universiade medalists in figure skating
Living people
Year of birth missing (living people)
Place of birth missing (living people)
Universiade gold medalists for the Soviet Union
Competitors at the 1983 Winter Universiade